Ruffer is an English surname. Notable people with the surname include:

Jonathan Ruffer (born 1951), British fund manager and philanthropist
Marc Armand Ruffer (1859–1917), Swiss-born English experimental pathologist
Maurice Ruffer (1857–1935), French-born British banker
Corinna Rüffer (born 1975), German politician

See also
Ruffer Investment Company, investment company listed on the London Stock Exchange
A Ruffer & Sons, defunct family bank

English-language surnames